Ionikos may refer to the following Greek sports clubs:

Ionikos Nikaias, a sports club in Nikaia
Ionikos F.C., or Ionikos Nikaias, a football club 
Ionikos Nikaias B.C., a basketball team 
Ionikos Nea Filadelfeia, a sports club in Nea Filadelfeia
Ionikos N.F. B.C., a basketball team 
Ionikos Lamias B.C., a basketball club in Lamia

See also

Ioniko (disambiguation)